Major Hon. Henry Balfour was Shire Commissioner for Fifeshire in the Parliament of Scotland prior to the Acts of Union 1707.

The last Scottish Parliament was originally summoned to meet at Edinburgh on 12 November 1702, but was prorogued until 6 May 1703. This Parliament then consisted on four distinct sessions – (1) 6 May 1703 – 16 September 1703; (2) 6 July 1704 – 28 August 1704; (3) 28 June 1705 – 21 September 1705; and (4) 3 October 1706 – 25 March 1707.  Major Henry Balfour of Dunbog was one of the members for Fifeshire in each of these four sessions.

Major Hon. Henry Balfour was the third son of John Balfour, 3rd Lord Balfour of Burleigh and Isabel Balfour.

He gained the rank of Major in the service of the Dragoons.

He lived at Dunbog, Fife.

References 

Members of the Parliament of Scotland 1702–1707
Shire Commissioners to the Parliament of Scotland
18th-century deaths
Year of birth missing
Year of death missing